Freezing Point (氷点; Hyōten) is the debut novel of Japanese novelist Ayako Miura, first serialized on Asahi Shimbun between 1964 and 1965. The novel won Asahi Shimbun'''s Ten Million Yen Award.

The novel has been adapted into numerous films and TV series in East Asia. An English translation by Hiromu Shimizu and John Terry was published in 1986.

English translation

Adaptations

FilmFreezing Point, a 1966 Japanese film directed by Satsuo YamamotoFreezing Point (冰點), a 1966 Taiwanese film directed by Hsin Chi Freezing Point (빙점), a 1967 South Korean film directed by Kim Soo-yongFreezing Point (빙점), a 1981 South Korean film directed by Ko Young-nam

TV seriesFreezing Point, a 1966 Japanese TV series on Nihon Educational TelevisionFreezing Point, a 1971 Japanese TV series on Tokyo Broadcasting SystemFreezing Point, a 1981 Japanese TV series on Mainichi Broadcasting SystemFreezing Point, a 1981 Japanese TV series on Yomiuri Telecasting CorporationFreezing Point, a 1989 Japanese TV series on TV AsahiFreezing Point, a 2001 Japanese TV series on TV AsahiFreezing Point, a 2006 Japanese TV series on TV AsahiFreezing Point (冰點), a 1988 Taiwanese TV series on Chinese Television SystemFreezing Point (빙점), a 1990 South Korean TV series on Korean Broadcasting SystemFreezing Point (빙점), a 2004 South Korean TV series on Munhwa Broadcasting Corporation

Sequel
Miura wrote the sequel Sequel to Freezing Point'' (続氷点) in 1971, and it was adapted for TV that year on TV Asahi.

See also
Asahikawa

1964 novels
20th-century Japanese novels
Japanese novels adapted into films